"My Lighthouse" is the first single by British band Pulp, released in 1983 and taken from the band's debut album It. The song is a gentle acoustic ballad, far from the disco feel that thrust the band into prominence in the early 1990s. There is a very slight difference between the single and album versions of "My Lighthouse". The drums and backing vocals are slightly louder on the single version, which was remixed in January 1983. It was performed live as part of Pulp's 2012 appearance at the Royal Albert Hall for the Teenage Cancer Trust.

Track listing
All songs written and composed by Jarvis Cocker and Simon Hinkler.

"My Lighthouse" (7" Mix) – 3:28
"Looking for Life" – 5:26

References

1983 songs
1983 debut singles
Pulp (band) songs
Songs written by Jarvis Cocker